The Geoffrey Bilson Award for Historical Fiction for Young Readers is a Canadian literary award that goes to the best work of historical fiction written for youth each year.  The award is named after Geoffrey Bilson, a writer of historical fiction for youth and a history professor at the University of Saskatchewan who died suddenly in 1987.

The Geoffrey Bilson Award is selected by a jury chosen by the Canadian Children's Book Centre. Award winners must be Canadian authors, and the winning novel must have been published in the previous calendar year. Each year's winner receives a $1000 (C$) prize.

The award is one of several presented by the Canadian Children's Book Centre each year; others include the Marilyn Baillie Picture Book Award, the Norma Fleck Award for Canadian Children's Non-Fiction and the TD Canadian Children's Literature Award.

Winners
1988 - Carol Matas, Lisa
1989 - joint winners
Martyn Godfrey, Mystery in the Frozen Lands
Dorothy Perkyns, Rachel's Revolution
1990 - Kit Pearson, The Sky is Falling
1991 - Marianne Brandis, The Sign of the Scales
1992 - no award
1993 - Celia Barker Lottridge, Ticket to Curlew
1994 - Kit Pearson, The Lights Go On Again
1995 - Joan Clark, The Dream Carvers
1996 - Marianne Brandis, Rebellion: A Novel of Upper Canada
1997 - Janet McNaughton, To Dance at the Palais Royale
1998 - Irene N. Watts, Good-Bye Marianne
1999 - Iain Lawrence, The Wreckers
2000 - deferred to following year
2001 - Sharon E. McKay, Charlie Wilcox
2002 - Virginia Frances Schwartz, If I Just Had Two Wings
2003 - Joan Clark, The Word for Home
2004 - Brian Doyle, Boy O'Boy
2005 - Michel Noël, Good for Nothing
2006 - Pamela Porter, The Crazy Man
2007 - Eva Wiseman, Kanada
2008 - Christopher Paul Curtis, Elijah of Buxton
2009 - John Ibbitson, The Landing
2010 - Shane Peacock, Vanishing Girl
2011 - Valerie Sherrard, The Glory Wind
2012 - Kate Cayley, The Hangman in the Mirror
2013 - Elizabeth Stewart, The Lynching of Louie Sam
2014 - Karen Bass, Graffiti Knight
2015 - Marsha Forchuk Skrypuch, Dance of the Banished
2016 - Karen Bass, Uncertain Soldier
2017 - Kevin Sands, The Mark of the Plague
2018 - Kevin Sands, The Assassin’s Curse
2019 - Christopher Paul Curtis, The Journey of Little Charlie
2020 - Tina Athaide, Orange for the Sunsets
2021 - Jordyn Taylor, The Paper Girl of Paris
2022 - Harriet Zaidman, Second Chances

References

External links

Geoffrey Bilson Award for Historical Fiction for Young Readers site

Canadian children's literary awards
Historical fiction awards
Awards established in 1988
1988 establishments in Canada